In 2016, the  will participate in the Currie Cup competition. The  team will play in the 2016 Under-21 Provincial Championship and the  team in the 2016 Under-19 Provincial Championship.

In addition, the formally affiliated Super Rugby franchise, the Southern Kings, will participate in the Super Rugby competition between February and July. From 2016, the team is controlled directly by SARU, and has no affiliation with the Eastern Province Rugby Union or Eastern Province Kings.

Chronological list of events

 11 November 2015: Following the failure of the EPRU to meet a deadline to pay their players' salaries, South African Rugby Players Association spokesperson Nyaniso Sam confirmed that all contracted players could sign contracts with other teams. Centre Tim Whitehead announced that he would be one of the players to leave the Kings.
 16 November 2015: The EP Rugby Union confirmed that Obi and fellow winger Sylvian Mahuza both stated their intention to leave, but also confirmed that Louis Fouché, Carel Greeff, James Hilterbrand, SP Marais, Caylib Oosthuizen, Mark Richards, JC Roos, Jurgen Visser and Stefan Watermeyer have joined the squad and started pre-season training.
 17 November 2015: The South African Rugby Union announced that they would take control of the Southern Kings Super Rugby franchise following the ongoing cashflow problems.
 27 November 2015: Loose-forward Tim Agaba – who previously stated his intention to leave – and outside back Siviwe Soyizwapi are both contracted by the South African Rugby Union for the South African Sevens team on two-year contracts.
 2 December 2015: Head coach Brent Janse van Rensburg resigned from his position, with the  confirming ongoing talks with Janse van Rensburg about joining their coaching staff.
 4 December 2015: The South African Rugby Union, who took control of the Southern Kings Super Rugby side on 17 November, announced their operational plan. As part of the plan, SARU would operate the franchise independently from the Eastern Province Kings, which meant that they would negotiate Super Rugby contracts with identified players, and not necessarily the same players previously signed to Super Rugby contract by the Eastern Province Rugby Union.
 7 December 2015: Eastern Province Kings players representative handed a petition to president Cheeky Watson, in which players announced their refusal to play for the Eastern Province Kings or Southern Kings until certain issues were sorted out; these issues included outstanding player salaries, a vote of confidence in the current EPRU executive committee and the appointment of specialists to propose a sustainable funding model for the rugby union.
 12 January 2016: English RFU Championship side Jersey announced the signing of EP Kings prop Simon Kerrod.
 26 January 2016: Three scholars from Linkside High School were given contracts to join the EP Kings Rugby Academy - lock Hussayn Banzi, fly-half Thabo Matiso and flank Lubabalo Ndamase.
 28 January 2016: The South African Rugby Players' Association submitted a liquidation application against EP Rugby (Pty) Ltd on behalf of eighteen Eastern Province Kings players who were not included in the Southern Kings Super Rugby squad for 2016 and have not received their salaries since September 2015.
 9 March 2016: The Eastern Province Rugby Union confirm that Kings Academy manager Robbi Kempson would be the head coach of the Eastern Province Kings for the 2016 Currie Cup qualification series.
 10 March 2016: The Port Elizabeth High Court provisionally liquidates Eastern Province Rugby, while a failure to pay outstanding player salaries before 10 May 2016 could see the liquidation order being made final.

Currie Cup qualification

Squad

The following players were named in the Eastern Province Kings squad for 2016 Currie Cup qualification series:

Standings

Round-by-round

Matches

The following matches were played in the 2016 Currie Cup qualification series:

Player Appearances

The player appearance record in the 2016 Currie Cup qualification series was as follows:

Currie Cup Premier Division

Squad

The following players were named in the Eastern Province Kings squad for 2016 Currie Cup Premier Division:

Standings

Round-by-round

Matches

The following matches were played in the 2016 Currie Cup Premier Division:

Player Appearances

The player appearance record in the 2016 Currie Cup Premier Division was as follows:

Under-21

Squad

The following players were named in the Eastern Province U21 squad for the 2016 Under-21 Provincial Championship:

Standings

The final league standings for the 2016 Under-21 Provincial Championship was:

Round-by-round

Matches

The following matches were played in the 2016 Currie Cup qualification series:

Player Appearances

The player appearance record in the 2016 Under-21 Provincial Championship is as follows:

Under-19

Squad

The following players were named in the Eastern Province U19 squad for 2016 Under-19 Provincial Championship:

Standings

The final league standings for the 2016 Under-19 Provincial Championship was:

Round-by-round

Matches

The following matches were played in the 2016 Currie Cup qualification series:

Player Appearances

The player appearance record in the 2016 Under-19 Provincial Championship is as follows:

Varsity Rugby

The following players were included in the Varsity Cup squad:

Youth weeks

The Eastern Province Rugby Union announced their squads for the 2016 Under-18 Craven Week, the 2016 Under-18 Academy Week and the 2016 Under-16 Grant Khomo Week tournaments on 24 May 2016:

Under-18 Craven Week

The 2016 Under-18 Craven Week competition was held between 11 and 16 July 2016 in Durban. Eastern Province Rugby Union entered two sides – Eastern Province U18 and Eastern Province Country Districts U18.

Under-18 Academy Week

The 2016 Under-18 Academy Week competition was held between 11 and 16 July 2016 in Durban. Eastern Province Rugby Union entered two sides – Eastern Province U18 and Eastern Province Country Districts U18.

Under-16 Grant Khomo Week

The 2016 Under-16 Grant Khomo Week competition was held between 4 and 8 July 2016 in Paarl.

Under-13 Craven Week Week

The 2016 Under-13 Craven Week competition was held between 4 and 8 July 2016 in Paarl.

See also

 Eastern Province Elephants
 Southern Kings
 2016 Currie Cup Premier Division
 2016 Under-21 Provincial Championship
 2016 Under-19 Provincial Championship

Notes

References

2016
2016 Currie Cup
2016 in South African rugby union